Philip John Stein (September 13, 1913 – April 4, 1987) was a professional ice hockey goaltender who played in one National Hockey League game for the Toronto Maple Leafs during the 1939–40 season, on January 18, 1940 against the Detroit Red Wings. The rest of his career, which lasted from 1933 to 1943, was spent in various minor leagues.

Career statistics

Regular season and playoffs

See also
 List of players who played only one game in the NHL

References

External links

1913 births
1987 deaths
Canadian ice hockey goaltenders
New Haven Eagles players
Omaha Knights (AHA) players
Providence Reds players
Ice hockey people from Toronto
Syracuse Stars (IHL) players
Toronto Maple Leafs players
Toronto Marlboros players